Thawb ( "garment"), also spelled thobe or tobe and known by various other names in different regions, is an ankle-length robe, usually with long sleeves. It is commonly worn in the Arabian Peninsula, the Middle East, North Africa, and other neighbouring Arab countries, and some countries in East and West Africa.

Etymology
The word thawb (ثَوْب) is the Arabic word for "garment". It is also romanized as thobe or thaub.

Prevalence and regional differences in names and use by gender

Middle East and North Africa 
The thawb is commonly worn by men in the Arabian Peninsula. It is normally made of cotton, but heavier materials such as sheep's wool can also be used, especially in colder climates in Iraq and Syria. The style of the thawb varies slightly among the various regions in the area. The sleeves and the collar can be stiffened to give a more formal appearance. Other names may be used for this garment. In Iraq, Kuwait, the Levant, and Oman, dishdashah is the most common word for the garment; in the United Arab Emirates and the Maghreb, the word kandura is used. The neck also tends to be more open than in its Saudi counterpart and, along with the breast pocket, is often embroidered. It might also lack buttons altogether. The thawb is known as a Jallabiya in Egypt, not to be confused with the Sa'idi or Fallahi Jallabiya, and is primarily worn by Arabs of Sinai, the Eastern desert, and Sharqia.

Sudan 

In Sudan, the term tobe is used to refer to women's outer garments. In her book Khartoum at night: Fashion and body politics in imperial Sudan, cultural historian Marie Grace Brown explained: "Meaning “bolt of cloth,” a tobe is a rectangular length of fabric, generally two meters wide and four to seven meters long. It is worn as an outer wrapper whenever women are outside their homes or in the company of unrelated males. The tobe’s origins date back to the late eighteenth century when prosperous merchants in Darfur clothed their wives and daughters in large swaths of fine imported linen, muslin, and silk as a sign of their wealth and prestige." In the context of urban culture in Sudan since the 1930s, new and often colourful styles of tobes became fashionable, as Sudanese women "expressed their growing opportunities and desires through fashion."

Palestine 
The traditional Palestinian woman's long tunic is also called thawb.  It is richly embroidered, with different colours and patterns signifying various aspects of the wearer's social position and it's unique from town or city to another.

Name variations

Other occasions
A thawb is sometimes worn with a bisht, also known in other parts of the Arabian Peninsula as a mishlah or ʿabāʾ, meaning 'cloak'. It is usually worn in ceremonial occasions or by officials. A bisht is usually worn by religious clergy, but can also be worn in weddings, Eids, and funerals.
It may indicate a status of wealth and royalty, or sometimes a religious position.
It was originally manufactured in Syria, Iraq and Jordan, and it is usually worn in Arabian peninsula, Jordan, Syria, and parts of southern Iraq.

According to H. R. P. Dickson, Bedouin women would mount a brightly coloured thawb on a pole in front of a tent in order to welcome home a traveller or an important person coming to visit.

Rashida Tlaib, a Democratic member of the United States House of Representatives from Michigan and the first Palestinian-American woman elected to that body, wore a thawb to her swearing-in ceremony on January 3, 2019. This inspired a number of Palestinian and Palestinian-American women to share pictures on social media with the hashtag #TweetYourThobe. Like the ghutra, thawbs were also popular during the 2022 FIFA World Cup in Qatar.

See also

 Agal
 Bisht
 Cassock
 Fez
 Hejazi turban
 Islam and clothing
 Izaar
 Jellabiya
 Kaftan
 Kanzu
 Keffiyeh
 Kurta
 Litham
 Shalwar Kameez
 Sherwani
 Sirwal
 Taqiyah

References

Arabic clothing
Gowns
History of Asian clothing
Islamic male clothing
Middle Eastern clothing